Take a Number is the debut album by New Zealand and Polynesian jazz singer Mavis Rivers. It was arranged by Nelson Riddle and released in 1959.

Reception

The initial Billboard magazine review from May 18, 1959 commented that "Polynesian canary Mavis Rivers lends her expressive jazz-flavored thrushing style to a group of "number" selections...Spinnable wax".

Track listing
 "One Minute to One" (J. Fred Coots, Sam M. Lewis) – 2:32
 "Two Loves Have I" – 4:03
 "Three Coins in the Fountain" (Sammy Cahn, Jule Styne) – 3:12
 "Four A.M." (L. Coleman) – 3:02
 "Five O'Clock Whistle" (Kim Gannon, Gene Irwin, Josef Myrow) – 2:06
 "Six Lessons from Madame La Zonga" (James V. Monaco) – 2:52
 "Seven-League Boots" – 2:46
 "Dinner at Eight" (Dorothy Fields, Jimmy McHugh) – 3:31  
 "About a Quarter to Nine" (Al Dubin, Harry Warren) – 3:05
 "One the Ten O' Ten" (J. Fred Coots) – 2:20
 "At the Eleventh Hour" – 3:01
 "It's Twelve O'Clock" (Coots) – 3:34

Personnel
Mavis Rivers – vocals
Nelson Riddle – arranger
Andy Wiswell – producer

References

1959 debut albums
Albums arranged by Nelson Riddle
Capitol Records albums
Mavis Rivers albums
Concept albums